Det bästa av Carola  is a Greatest Hits album by Swedish singer Carola Häggkvist. It was released on November 19, 1997 in Sweden and Norway.

Track listing

CD 1
Främling
Mickey
Liv
Tommy tycker om mig
På egna ben
Gloria
Det regnar i Stockholm
Säg mig var du står
Hunger
Ännu en dag
Brand New Heart
The Runaway
Mitt i ett äventyr
The Girl Who Had Everything
I'll Live

CD 2
Dreamer
Every Beat Of My Heart
All The Reasons To Live
Fångad av en stormvind
Oh Happy Day
Save The Children
Det kommer dagar
Guld i dina ögon
Sanna vänner
Så länge jag lever
Det bästa jag vet
The Sound Of Music
Just The Way You Are
Believe
Mixade minnen (Radio Mix)

Release history

Charts

References

1997 greatest hits albums
Carola Häggkvist albums